Muhammad Ahmad Mahgoub (17 May 1908 – 23 June 1976) was both Foreign Minister and then the 6th Prime Minister of Sudan. He was also an important Sudanese literary writer, who published several volumes of poetry and literary criticism in Arabic.

He was born in the city of Aldewen in 1908. He moved to Khartoum at the age of seven. Mahgoub graduated from engineering school in 1929 and in 1938, he obtained a Bachelor of Laws degree from the Gordon Memorial College. He was elected to parliament in 1946. After independence, Mahgoub was foreign minister between 1956 and 1958, and then again between 1964 and 1965. In 1965, he was elected Prime Minister, but subsequently forced to resign. In 1967, he was elected Prime Minister for the second time and served in that position until 1969.

References

Further reading 
 Abd al Hayy, M. (1976). Conflict and Identity: The Cultural Poetics of Contemporary Sudanese Poetry. Khartoum.
 Ahmed O.H. and Berkley, C.E. (eds.) (1982) Anthology of Sudanese Poetry. Washington DC. 

1908 births
1976 deaths
20th-century Sudanese writers
20th-century Sudanese poets
Foreign ministers of Sudan
Prime Ministers of Sudan
20th-century poets